Nicholas Anthony Fletcher (born 15 July 1972) is a British Conservative Party politician who has been the Member of Parliament (MP) for Don Valley since the 2019 general election. He is the first Conservative to ever be elected for the seat.

Early life and career 
Fletcher grew up in Armthorpe, Doncaster, and attended Armthorpe Comprehensive before gaining a HNC in electronic engineering in 1992. In 1994, after being made redundant, he took a business course and established Analogue Electrics in Doncaster. Fletcher also owns a property portfolio consisting of ten residential properties.

Before being elected to Parliament, Fletcher served as the director of Doncaster Chamber of Commerce (Doncaster Chamber) from 19 December 2018 to 13 December 2019. He also served as the chairman of the Doncaster Conservative Federation.

Controversies 

In his first notable media presence, as part of a debate in the UK Parliament's Westminster Hall, for International Men's Day 2021, Fletcher claimed that male role models in film and television were being replaced by women (namely Luke Skywalker, The Equalizer, Doctor Who, and The Ghostbusters), linking that to the number of young men turning to crime. His apparent opposition to women playing these roles was criticised by fellow MPs (including Luke Pollard), and also condemned by social media users as sexist and misogynistic.

In his defence, Fletcher claims this part of his speech was dealing with the wider issue of positive role-models for young men and that the controversy results from looking only at a short section.

In June 2022, Fletcher sent letters to all schools in his constituency urging head teachers to “push back” against the “transgender lifestyle”, arguing that allowing children to take hormone blockers is “affirming something that is nothing more than a phase”. The letters were not well received by Doncaster Schools, with one school reporting that the letters were “neither helpful nor positively received”

Parliamentary career 
Fletcher won the seat of Don Valley from Labour incumbent Caroline Flint in 2019, with a majority of 8%, representing a swing of 8.1%. In doing so, he was the first Conservative to be elected for the seat, with the constituency having been held by Labour since 1922.

Fletcher delivered his maiden speech on 16 March 2020, where he spoke about the importance of role models for young people.

Since 2 March 2020, Fletcher has been a member of the Petitions Committee.

Following an interim report on the connections between colonialism and properties now in the care of the National Trust, including links with historic slavery, Fletcher was among the signatories of a letter to The Telegraph in November 2020 from the "Common Sense Group" of Conservative Parliamentarians. The letter accused the National Trust of being "coloured by cultural Marxist dogma, colloquially known as the 'woke agenda'".

Fletcher endorsed Kemi Badenoch during the July 2022 Conservative Party leadership election. After Badenoch was eliminated, Fletcher supported Liz Truss.

In February 2023 Fletcher raised concerns around the urban design concept of the "15-minute city" in the House of Commons, requesting time to discuss the matter he referred to as an "international socialist concept".

Affiliations 
Fletcher sits as a Vice Chair or Officer for several All-Party Parliamentary Groups, including:

 APPG on Electric Vehicles
 APPG on Transport Across the North
 APPG on Shared Ownership Housing
 APPG on Skills, Careers and Employment 
 APPG on Small and Micro Business
He is also chair of APPG on Issues Affecting Men and Boys

Fletcher is a member of the Northern Research Group, a group founded by Conservative MPs who represent constituencies in northern England, Wales and the Scottish Borders. He is also a member of the Common Sense Group, a Parliamentary organisation which represents the socially conservative wing of the Conservative Party.

Personal life
Fletcher resides in Bawtry and is married to Gail. They have two children, James and Lucy. He is a practising Christian.

He has been a long-time runner. He ran the London Marathon in October 2021, raising over £2,000 for his chosen charity, the Children's Cancer and Leukaemia Group.

References

External links

1972 births
Living people
Conservative Party (UK) MPs for English constituencies
UK MPs 2019–present
People from Bawtry
British real estate businesspeople
Businesspeople from Yorkshire
English businesspeople in property